A gavit (Armenian ) or zhamatun is often contiguous to the west of a church in a Medieval Armenian monastery. It served as narthex (entrance to the church), mausoleum and assembly room.

History
The gavit, the distinctive Armenian style of narthex, appeared in the tenth and eleventh centuries. The first were located in the south of the Armenia in the region of Syunik. The type of construction changed during the twelfth and fourteenth centuries, as found in the monasteries of Saghmosavank of Haritchavank, or Hovhannavank Monastery. They changed again in the late thirteenth century as can be seen in monasteries such as Gandzasar, and gradually ceased to be built in the late Middle Ages.

Structure
The earliest style of gavit consists of an oblong vault supported by double arches, with an erdik (lantern) center. This form was replaced by a square room with four columns, divided into nine sections with a dome in the center. The last evolution consists of a gavit without columns and with arched ceilings.

On the west side of the Church of the Holy Redeemer in the Sanahin Monastery complex, the gavit built in 1181 has four tall free-standing internal pillars supporting arches. The pillars and their bases are elaborately decorated. In the same complex, the gavit of the Mother of God church is a three-nave hall with lower arches and less elaborate decorations on the pillars.

References

Church architecture
Eastern Christian liturgy
Armenian words and phrases